Sheykh Musa (also Romanized as Sheykh Mūsá; also known as Shaikh Museh) is a village in Aq Bolagh Rural District, Sojas Rud District, Khodabandeh County, Zanjan Province, Iran. At the 2006 census, its population was 317, in 65 families.

References 

Populated places in Khodabandeh County